Lady Bird may refer to:

Arts and media
 Lady Bird (film), a 2017 film directed by Greta Gerwig
 Lady Bird (duo), a dance music crew from Japan
 "Lady Bird" (composition), a jazz standard by Tadd Dameron
 "Lady Bird", a song by Lee Hazlewood, in duet with Nancy Sinatra, on the album Nancy & Lee
 Lady Bird (album), a 1978 album by Archie Shepp

Other uses
 Lady Bird Johnson, a popular nickname for Claudia Alta Taylor Johnson, the First Lady of the United States from 1963 to 1969
 Lady Bird Lake, a reservoir on the Colorado River in Austin, Texas

See also
 Ladybird (disambiguation)
 Ladybug (disambiguation)